Butterworth was launched in 1778 in France as the highly successful 32-gun privateer Américaine, of Granville. The British Royal Navy captured her early in 1781. She first appeared in a commercial role in 1784 as America, and was renamed in 1785 as Butterworth. She served primarily as a whaler in the Greenland whale fisheries. New owners purchased her in 1789. She underwent a great repair in 1791 that increased her size by almost 20%. She is most famous for her role in the "Butterworth Squadron", which took her and two ship's tenders on an exploration, sealing, otter fur, and whaling voyage to Alaska and the Pacific Coast of North America. She and her consorts are widely credited with being the first European vessels to enter, in 1794, what is now Honolulu harbour. After her return to England in 1795, Butterworth went on three more whaling voyages to the South Pacific, then Africa, and then the South Pacific again. In 1802 she was outward bound on her fourth of these voyage, this to the South Pacific, when she was lost.

French privateer
Many accounts of the Butterworth Squadron refer to Butterworth as a former French 30-gun frigate. The tern "frigate" was often used loosely. Butterworths previous name was American, and there was no French warship of that name that fit her description. However, there was a French privateer frigate Américaine, of Granville, that carried 32 guns and that was active between 1779 and 1780.

Between 1778 and 1779 Américaine was under the command of Captain Paul Eudes de la Cocardière. Under his command she captured at least four prizes: Hunter, Sorel, Edgipezeriere, and Good Intent. He paid Américaine off on 20 May 1779.

Captain François Jourdan de la Monnerie was her next captain, in 1780. Under his command she captured the prizes Machora, Betsy, Sil Lah, Race Horse, Elisabeth Quenley, Notre Dame du Rosaire, and Hanto of Black. He paid her off on 3 July 1780.

Américaine then made a third cruise. On 17 January 1781 Américaine recaptured the Dutch ship Hendrick Frederick, Captain Raba, master. Hendrick Fredrick had been sailing from Oporto to Nantz with 400 chests of fruit when on 13 December at  Little Ben, Hayes, master, had captured her.

 captured the "private man of war" Américaine on 26 January 1781. She was armed with 32 guns and carried a crew of 245. Prudente and  brought "the American French Privateer" into Portsmouth. Ambuscade shared in the proceeds of the capture.

British career
America first appears in supplementary pages to Lloyd's Register for 1784. She is described as a ship of French origin and 330 tons (bm), launched in 1778. Her master is Boudinot, her owner J. Atkinson, and her trade New York-London.

In 1785 America was sold and her new owner, Butterworth, renamed her Butterworth. He then employed her as a Greenland whaler under Captain M. Pile, changing in 1786 to J. Cockburn. Ellison succeeded Cockburn. Lloyd's List reported in July 1787 that Butterworth, Ellison, master, was at Davis Strait, having taken six fish (whales). On 17 June 1788 Butterworth was again at Davis Strait, having taken three fish.

Then in 1789, T. Pritzler (or Pritzlea) replaced Butterworth as owner, and William Brown became her master. Her trade became London-Davis Strait.

At some point around 1791 Brown approached interested parties with a proposal to explore Baffin Bay or approach the North Pole.

In 1791 four individuals signed a testimonial to the gun-maker Charles Moore, of East Smithfield, certifying that Moore's harpoon gun was particularly suited to whale fishing as it kept the priming dry. The four were: Theophilus Pritzler (as master of Lyon), Sinclair Halcrow (as master of Lyon), William Stavers (as master of Leviathan), and William Brown (as master of Butterworth).

In 1791 Butterworths trade became London-Greenland, changing to London-Nootka. In 1792 Butterworths burthen changed to 390 tons after a "great repair" in 1791.

Butterworth squadron

Alderman William Curtis, Theophilus Pritzler, and probably John Perry, a Blackwall shipbuilder, financed an expedition consisting of three vessels, Butterworth, and two smaller tenders: Jackall, Alexander Stewart (or Steward), master, and Prince Lee Boo, E. Sharp, master. Captain William Brown, master of Butterworth, commanded the expedition.

The expedition is notable for a violent conflict with the Tla-o-qui-aht People of Vancouver Island and another reported conflict in Formosa. Butterworth, Jackal and Prince Lee Boo are often credited with being the first European vessels to enter Honolulu Harbor.

France declared war on Britain on 1 February 1793. Brown received a letter of marque on 26 June 1793, i.e., in absentia. All three vessels of the Butterworth squadron were well at Nootka in October 1793. In late 1793 Brown transferred to Jackall, Sharp transferred to Butterworth, and Robert Gordon took command of Prince Lee Boo.
 
On 14 March 1794 Butterworth and Prince Lee Boo were well at "Mout Lerry", Nootka.  and  had wintered there and then sailed for the Sandwich Islands.

Butterworth then sailed to the California coast, and from there to the Galapagos.

At some point Butterworth encountered . Rattler, James Colnett, master, was on voyage of exploration to the Pacific for the whaling firm of Samuel Enderby & Sons.

Jackall and Prince Lee Boo were at Hawai'i by 1 January 1795. There Brown and Gordon were killed defending their vessels from an attack by the locals. The Hawaiians captured both vessels but their crews recaptured them. George Lampert and William Bonallack replaced Brown and Gordon as captains of the two vessels.

Butterworth returned to England from the Galapagos on 3 February 1795. She was under the command of Sharpe, and carried 85 tuns of whale oil and 17500 seal skins. She arrived back at London 24 April 1808.

Whaling
In 1795, Butterworth, Sinclair Halcrow, master, may have sailed on a whaling voyage. There is no further information on this voyage. Lloyd's Register for 1796 shows her master changing from W. Brown to S. Halcrow and her trade from London-Nootka to London-South Seas.

Halcrow received a letter of marque on  21 March 1796. He then sailed her on a whaling voyage, this one to Delagoa Bay. Lloyd's List, dated 9 December 1796, reported that a French privateer had attacked Butterworth in Delagoa Bay, but that Butterworth had repelled the attack. Butterworth put into Rio de Janeiro in March 1797, for water, refreshment, and calefaction; she also had sick aboard. She returned to Britain on 1 June.

On 16 September 1797, Captain Lawrence Frazier received a letter of marque for Butterworth. He sailed from Britain on 4 October 1797 for the Pacific Ocean. By this time Mather & Co. had purchased Butterworth. She was reported to have been at the Galapagos islands in August–September 1798. She was in the Marquesas Islands in January 1799. There she gave passage to England to the missionary William Pascoe Crook. She arrived in Britain on 19 May 1799.

Butterworth and New Euphrates received permission on 7 March 1800 from the British East India Company to sail east of the Cape of Good Hope to the Southern Whale Fishery. Butterworth left London on 18 March 1800, Henry Glasspoole (or  Glaspool), master. She sailed on 27 April with a fleet of 150 sail under convoy. On 15 May she and Leviathan received the fleet commodore's permission to leave the fleet. Butterworth and Leviathan parted company on 24 May. In June Butterworth stopped at Rio de Janeiro for water, food, refreshment, and calefaction. She was well on the coast of Chile in April 1801, and had gathered 700 barrels of sperm oil.  She returned to Britain on 23 March 1802, having gathered more than 920 barrels of whale oil while whaling off Chile.

Loss
Lloyd's List reported that Butterworth, Folger, master, had been lost on 13 July 1802 off St. Jago, while outbound to the Southern Fisheries. One man was drowned, but the rest of the crew were saved and returned to Portsmouth.

Notes

Citations

References
 
 
 

 
 
 
 
  
 
Transactions of the Society, Instituted at London for the Encouragement of Arts, Manufactures and Commerce (1791). (:London, Dodsley, Lockyer)

Ships built in France
1778 ships
Privateer ships
Captured ships
Sealing ships
Whaling ships
Maritime incidents in 1802
Shipwrecks in the Caribbean Sea